Remians are the graduates of Dhaka Residential Model College, a college in Bangladesh. Students of the Dhaka Residential Model College (DRMC) are called Remians. The term is regarded as a prestigious designation held by graduates of DRMC. Remians founded an organization in Bangladesh known as ORWA, the Old Remians Welfare Association. Remians who are living in Canada have formed Remians Canada to increase the fraternity among the remians living in Canada.

Remians and ORWA members have played a vital role in the development of Bangladesh, contributing to society as government officers, doctors, scientists, engineers, army officers, and professors. Many senior government officials of Bangladesh are Remians.

Notable Remians have included:

 Sheikh Jamal, the second son of the founding leader of Bangladesh Bangabandhu Sheikh Mujibur Rahman and slain brother of the current Prime Minister Sheikh Hasina. He was also known as a freedom fighter in the Bangladesh Liberation War.
 Tareq Zia, a well-known politician and Senior Joint Secretary-General of the Bangladesh Nationalist Party (BNP). He is the son of a former President of Bangladesh, the late Major General Ziaur Rahman, and Khaleda Zia, a former Prime Minister of Bangladesh.
 Shamsher Mubin Chowdhury, a former Foreign Secretary of the Government of Bangladesh.
 Mohamed Mijarul Quayes, a former Foreign Secretary, High Commissioner to the United Kingdom, and ambassador to Russia

References

External links
 Old Remians Welfare Organization
 ORWA election
 
 remians.ca, Website of Dhaka Residential Model College alumni in Canada
 The pro-poor tech prodigy

Education in Dhaka